Álvaro Montesinos (born 24 September 1963) is a Spanish gymnast. He competed in seven events at the 1988 Summer Olympics.

References

1963 births
Living people
Spanish male artistic gymnasts
Olympic gymnasts of Spain
Gymnasts at the 1988 Summer Olympics
People from Torrent, Valencia
Sportspeople from the Province of Valencia